5 Train may refer to:
 5 (New York City Subway service)
 Line 5 Blue (Montreal Metro)
 Line 5, Beijing Subway
 Line 5, Shanghai Metro
 Paris Métro Line 5

See also
 Line 5 (disambiguation)